Stephen John Ball,  (born 21 January 1950) is a British sociologist and the Karl Mannheim Professor of Sociology of Education at the Institute of Education of University College London (formerly part of the University of London). He has been described as "one of the most eminent scholars in the field of education policy". In 2013, Michael W. Apple wrote that "...one of the things that set Stephen Ball apart from many others is his insistence that both structural and poststructural theories and analyses are necessary for ‘bearing witness’ and for an adequate critical understanding of educational realities". He is the co-editor-in-chief of the Journal of Education Policy, alongside founding editor Ivor Goodson.

Honours
Ball was elected a Fellow of the Royal Society of Arts (FRSA) in 1998, a Fellow of the Academy of Social Sciences (FAcSS) in 2000, and a Fellow of the British Academy (FBA) in 2006.

References

External links
 

1950 births
Living people
Academics of the University of London
Educational researchers
Fellows of the British Academy
Academics of King's College London
Academics of the University of Sussex
Alumni of the University of Essex
Alumni of the University of Sussex
Fellows of the Academy of Social Sciences
Academic journal editors
Sociologists of education